Didogobius is a genus of small marine fish in the family Gobiidae, the true gobies. They are native to the eastern Atlantic Ocean and the Mediterranean Sea. The name of the genus is a compound noun made up of Dido, the mythical founder and first queen of Carthage, and the Latin gobius meaning "goby".

Species
Seven recognized species are in this genus:
 Didogobius amicuscaridis Schliewen & Kovačić, 2008
 Didogobius bentuvii P. J. Miller, 1966 (Ben-Tuvia's goby)
 Didogobius helenae Van Tassell & A. Kramer, 2014 (Helen's goby) 
 Didogobius kochi Van Tassell, 1988
 Didogobius schlieweni P. J. Miller, 1993
 Didogobius splechtnai Ahnelt & Patzner, 1995
 Didogobius wirtzi Schliewen & Kovačić, 2008

References

 
Gobiinae